This article lists the heads of state of Poland. Currently, the president of Poland is the head of state of the country.

Poland in the Early Middle Ages
See: Poland in the Early Middle Ages

Legendary rulers
Most of these rulers appear for the first time in chronicles from the 13th century

Semi-legendary dukes of the Polans in Greater Poland
Several historians tend to believe that three legendary rulers of early Poland before Mieszko I might actually be historical persons. They appear in the oldest Polish chronicle, Gesta principum Polonorum from the early 12th century.

Kingdom of Poland and Duchy of Poland, 966–1569

Piast dukes and kings

Fragmentation of the Kingdom of Poland, 1138–1314

Piast high dukes

Reunification attempts in the Kingdom of Poland 1232–1305

Piast kings

Přemyslid kings

Reunited Kingdom of Poland, 1314–1569

Piast kings

Anjou kings

Jagiellonian kings

Polish–Lithuanian Commonwealth, 1569–1795

Duchy of Warsaw, 1807–1815

Republic of Poland (1918–1939)

Chief of State

President of the Republic

Government of the Republic of Poland in Exile (1939–1990)

After the German conquest of Poland, a Polish government-in-exile was formed under the protection of France and Britain. The President of the Republic and the government-in-exile were recognized by the United Kingdom and, later, by the United States until 6 July 1945, when the Western Allies accepted the Communist-led government backed by Stalin. Despite having lost recognition by other governments, the government-in-exile continued in London until the election of Lech Wałęsa as President of the Republic of Poland in December 1990, upon which it handed over its formal powers and the insignia of the Polish Second Republic to President-elect Wałęsa in a ceremony at the Warsaw Royal Castle on 22 December 1990.

The sole internationally recognized President of the exiled government was Władysław Raczkiewicz, who took office after Ignacy Mościcki's resignation in September 1939.

People's Republic of Poland (1944–1989)

President of the State National Council
The Provisional Government of the Republic of Poland was founded under Soviet protection on 31 December 1944 and recognized by the United States and the United Kingdom since 6 July 1945. It evolved into the Government of National Unity on 28 June 1945, and eventually into the People's Republic of Poland on 19 February 1947

President of the Republic

Chairman of the Council of State

In 1952, the July Constitution abolished the office of president and made the Council of State the collective head of state, chairmen of which are listed below. Real power rested with the Polish United Workers' Party (PZPR), its Central Committee and its secretary general/first secretary.

First Secretaries of the Polish Workers' Party (PPR) / Polish United Workers' Party (PZPR)
Since 1954, the head of the party was also the Chairman of the Central Committee:

 By the second half of 1989, the office of First Secretary, occupied at the time by Mieczysław Rakowski, ceased to hold any real power.

Republic of Poland (1989–present)

President of the Republic

See also
Prime Minister of Poland
List of prime ministers of Poland
List of Polish monarchs

References

List
Polish presidents
Heads of state